The Martin XNBL-2 was a 1920s biplane night light bomber proposal by the Glenn Martin Company for the United States Army Air Service.  Two prototypes were ordered in 1922, but cancelled before construction began, due to lack of funding.

Specifications

References 

Martin aircraft
1920s United States bomber aircraft